Brad Spence (born 19 April 1984 in Calgary, Alberta) is a Canadian alpine skier.

He competed at the 2010 Winter Olympics in Vancouver in the men's slalom and giant slalom competitions.

References

External links
 Brad Spence at the 2010 Winter Olympics

 Twitter

1984 births
Living people
Olympic alpine skiers of Canada
Skiers from Calgary
Alpine skiers at the 2010 Winter Olympics
Canadian male alpine skiers
Alpine skiers at the 2014 Winter Olympics